The Bungil Formation is a geological formation in Australia whose strata date back to the Early Cretaceous. Dinosaur remains are among the fossils that have been recovered from the formation.

Vertebrate paleofauna

See also 
 List of dinosaur-bearing rock formations
 South Polar region of the Cretaceous

References

Bibliography 
  

Geologic formations of Australia
Cretaceous System of Australia
Early Cretaceous Australia
Aptian Stage
Barremian Stage
Hauterivian Stage
Valanginian Stage
Mudstone formations
Siltstone formations
Sandstone formations
Coal formations
Coal in Australia
Fossiliferous stratigraphic units of Oceania
Paleontology in Queensland